National Highway 346, commonly referred to as NH 346 is a national highway in  India. It is a spur road of National Highway 46. NH-346 traverses the state of Madhya Pradesh in India.

Route 

Jharkheda, Berasia, Vidisha, Kurwai, Mungaoli, Chanderi.

Junctions  

  Terminal near Jharkheda.

See also 

 List of National Highways in India
 List of National Highways in India by state

References

External links 

 NH 346 on OpenStreetMap

National highways in India
National Highways in Madhya Pradesh